Türkyurdu, historically Gâvurköy ( 'giaour village'), is a village in the Şehitkamil District, Gaziantep Province, Turkey.

References

Villages in Şehitkamil District